New Ulm High School (NUHS) is a public high school in New Ulm, Minnesota, United States. It is part of the New Ulm Public Schools district.

History 

Due to budget cuts for school funding from the state in 2007, the New Ulm Middle School had to shut down, and shared space with the New Ulm High School until 2016. A new high school was built and opened in the fall of 2016 after a referendum was passed in 2014. The other district buildings were remodeled and the old high school became the middle school. The original 1915 high school building was listed on the National Register of Historic Places in 2015.

Events and organizations 
Student organizations include Speech, Math Counts, Knowledge Bowl, Junior High Knowledge Bowl, Robotics, One Act, SPOTS, Student Council, FFA, FCCLA, Oak Street Singers, Jazz Band, Choir, Band, Pops Choir, Mock Trial, and Yearbook.

Sports 
New Ulm High School competes in the Big South Conference.

Notable alumni 
 Ali Bernard - American Female Wrestler
 Wanda Gag - American Artist
 Jamie Hoffmann - Former MLB Player
 Terry Steinbach - Former MLB Player and Coach

References

External links 
 

Public high schools in Minnesota
New Ulm, Minnesota
Schools in Brown County, Minnesota
School buildings on the National Register of Historic Places in Minnesota
National Register of Historic Places in Brown County, Minnesota
Educational institutions established in 1857
1857 establishments in Minnesota Territory